Ricochet is a fictional character appearing in American comic books published by Marvel Comics. It was originally an alternate identity used by the fictional superhero Spider-Man and later adopted by college student Jonathan "Johnny" Gallo.

Peter Parker
When Spider-Man was accused of murder during the Identity Crisis storyline, Peter Parker donned four different costumes to disguise his identity so that he could continue saving lives. One of the personas that he adopted was Ricochet. Starting with a leather jacket with an R on it, his wife created a costume and weapons. Ricochet was similar to Spider-Man, but even more jocular. He relied primarily on his agility, and posed as a criminal for hire. Using this identity, Peter collaborated for a time with his old foe Delilah in searching for information about the new villain Black Tarantula, and they battled Roughouse and Bloodscream together. In the final fight, Parker used all four of his new identities, to confuse his foes, and to contradict speculation that the new heroes were all, in fact, the same person. Once Parker had cleared his name, he abandoned all of his new personas, and returned to his Spider-Man identity.

Although the hero Black Marvel later gave Johnny Gallo a duplicate Ricochet costume, Peter remained in possession of the original.

Powers and abilities
In addition to his regular abilities (although Peter Parker noted that he tried to move slightly slower than usual and ignore his spider-sense while acting as Ricochet to prevent anyone realizing the truth) the Ricochet costume had flying discs on the sleeves of its jacket which he used as weapons.

Johnny Gallo

Publication history
Johnny Gallo first appeared as Ricochet in Slingers #0 (Dec. 1998). The character was created by Joseph Harris and Adam Pollina.

Ricochet appeared as a supporting character in Avengers Academy, first in issue #21 (Jan. 2012), and occasionally thereafter in the series.

Fictional character biography
Johnny was a college student who lived with his widowed father. He carefully concealed from both his father and his girlfriend Kathy the fact that he was a mutant, endowed with superior agility and the ability to sense danger. The Black Marvel presented Johnny with the Ricochet costume and the chance to be part of his team, the Slingers. Johnny accepted, becoming the new Ricochet. He could freely use his powers to help people without revealing his mutant nature. Much like Spider-Man, Ricochet enjoyed joking during the heat of battle, even though this annoyed his teammates, especially team leader Prodigy. Another of the Slingers, the Hornet, became Ricochet's closest friend, and gave him special throwing discs to use in battle. Dusk, also a teammate, was attracted to Ricochet, but he did not have the same feelings for her. Using his leaping abilities and reflexes, Ricochet fought crime lords, mutated vermin, and even Spider-Man himself. Ricochet learned that Black Marvel had made a deal with Mephisto, the demon king, to recruit the youths who would become the Slingers, and that Mephisto held Black Marvel captive. Ricochet was the first to suggest abandoning their "mentor" when offered the chance to save him, but Hornet convinced him to free Black Marvel. Shortly after, the Slingers disbanded.

Later, Ricochet became disillusioned because his efforts had not earned him any fame or recognition, and he blamed himself for the Hornet's death at the hands of a brainwashed Wolverine. He joined another team of teen heroes, Excelsior (now called the Loners), whose goal was to dissuade other superpowered young people from becoming heroes. During the aftermath of M-Day, when a majority of mutants lost their powers, Ricochet was one of the few who kept his abilities.

The Initiative
Johnny is being considered as a 'potential recruit' for the Initiative program, according to Civil War: Battle Damage Report.  He is currently in Los Angeles alongside other 'retired' superheroes.  He has been seen (along with the other members of the Loners) as one of the newer, part-time students at the Avengers Academy.

Scarlet Spider
Following Hydra's takeover of America, after a figure that appears to be the Hornet attacks a food delivery to a casino owned by Cassandra Mercury, Ricochet appears to save the Scarlet Spider from an attack by the Hornet, telling the other hero that he is there to find out how his 'dead' friend can be alive. Ricochet claims that he arrived in Las Vegas by chance to act as a new hero for the city, but although the Scarlet Spider allows Ricochet to accompany him to the casino that apparently hired Hornet, he webs Ricochet to the roof of the casino because he was unsatisfied with the other's explanation. Ricochet escapes the webbing by removing his boots, but when they confront the Hornet, he uses an amulet to summon an other-dimensional monster.

Powers and abilities
Ricochet has the mutant power of superhuman agility, enabling him to leap great distances. He has incredible reflexes and coordination which, combined with his leaping powers, allow him to seemingly bounce off walls (ricochet, as it were). Ricochet's mutant powers also give him a "Danger Sense" that functions much like Spider-Man's "Spider-Sense". Thanks to Hornet, Ricochet has special throwing discs, which he stores on the sleeves of his jacket. His original discs could bounce off walls and targets with incredible force. Hornet later gave Ricochet discs that could explode on impact. Ricochet's super reflexes and coordination enable him to throw his discs with amazing speed and accuracy.

In other media

Television
Ricochet appears in The Spectacular Spider-Man as the alias of Fancy Dan (voiced by Phil LaMarr), a member of the Enforcers who uses a suit that gives him the power to bounce off of objects at high speeds.

Video games
 The Peter Parker incarnation of Ricochet appears as an alternate skin for Spider-Man in Spider-Man: Edge of Time via DLC.
 The Peter Parker incarnation of Ricochet appears as an alternate skin for Spider-Man in The Amazing Spider-Man 2. This version is stated to be inspired by an in-universe comic book series that Peter Parker enjoyed as a child and sought to recreate.

DC Comics
An unrelated Ricochet appears in Hawkman Annual #1. This Ricochet is an acrobatic criminal with the ability to leap across  great distances, and was genetically engineered for the Sunderland Corporation by Dr. Moon. He fights Katar Hol and Shayera Thal in Chicago, and loses.

References

External links
 Ricochet (Johnny Gallo) at Marvel.com
 

Articles about multiple fictional characters
Comics characters introduced in 1998
Fictional blade and dart throwers
Fictional characters from New York City
Fictional characters with precognition
Marvel Comics characters with superhuman strength
Marvel Comics mutants
Marvel Comics superheroes